Paperboys is a 2001 documentary film by American director Mike Mills.

The 41-minute film, produced by Andy Spade, profiles six paperboys from Stillwater, Minnesota. They invite Mills into their homes, show him their personal effects, and answer questions about their lives and the future of paperboys. Parents weigh in on the benefits of their children's job and share thoughts on how the city has changed over the years. Mills's camera follows the boys on their routes, and the elegiac footage is accented with contemporary music.

External links
 
Paperboys at the Palm Pictures website

Child labor in the United States
American documentary films
2001 films
2001 documentary films
Documentary films about children
Documentary films about newspaper publishing
Films shot in Minnesota
Films directed by Mike Mills
Stillwater, Minnesota
Documentary films about Minnesota
2000s English-language films
2000s American films